Provincial Road 361 (PR 361) is a very short provincial road in Manitoba, Canada.

Route description
PR 361 starts at PTH 5 and PTH 50 in McCreary and terminates at the east boundary of Riding Mountain National Park, where it continues as an unmarked road. PR 361 provided access to the Mount Agassiz Ski Resort, which was the largest ski hill within the province of Manitoba before it ceased operations in 2000.

The highway is paved for its entire length.

References

External links 
Manitoba Official Map - West Central

361